Shelby is a city in and the county seat of Cleveland County, North Carolina, United States. It lies near the western edge of the Charlotte combined statistical area. The population was 21,918 at the 2020 census.

History
The area was originally inhabited by Catawba and Cherokee peoples and was later settled between around 1760. The city was chartered in 1843 and named after Colonel Isaac Shelby, a hero of the battle of Kings Mountain (1780) during the American Revolution. Shelby was agricultural until the railways in the 1870s stimulated Shelby's development. Textiles later became its chief industry during the 1920s when production of cotton in Cleveland County rose from 8,000 to 80,000 bales a year. Cotton production peaked in 1948 with Cleveland County producing 83,549 bales, making it North Carolina's premier cotton county. In the 1930s, Shelby was known as “the leading shopping center between Charlotte and Asheville”  People from surrounding counties came to Shelby to shop, since there were numerous types of local and chain stores. By 1947, Shelby was a true thriving town with the mills paying among the highest wages in the South. In the 1950s, droughts, insect infestations, and government acreage controls resulted in the decline of cotton as Cleveland County's primary crop.

The architecture of Shelby is noteworthy in that despite being in a rural area, there are magnificent homes and buildings with unique character. Some buildings are county landmarks, such as the Historic Campbell Building and others are listed on the National Register of Historic Places: Banker's House, Joshua Beam House, Central Shelby Historic District, Cleveland County Courthouse, East Marion-Belvedere Park Historic District, James Heyward Hull House, Masonic Temple Building, Dr. Victor McBrayer House, George Sperling House and Outbuildings, Joseph Suttle House, Webbley, and West Warren Street Historic District.

Shelby was home to a group of political leaders in the first half of the 20th century that have become known as the "Shelby Dynasty." These men wielded power through the local, State and Federal governments. The most notable men of Shelby's political leadership were brothers James L. Webb and Edwin Yates Webb and brothers-in-law O. Max Gardner and Clyde R. Hoey. As governors, NC representatives, and US congressman, the group impacted Shelby life and Shelby's reputation throughout the state.

In 1916, Thomas Dixon, Jr., the author of The Clansman: A Historical Romance of the Ku Klux Klan, planned to erect a statue of his uncle Leroy McAfee on the courthouse square. The project was initially met with enthusiasm, until it was announced that Dixon wanted McAfee to wear a Ku Klux Klan mask in the statue. A Confederate monument is located on the west side of the courthouse square while foreign war monuments stand on the north and south sides.

Community 
Shelby's community of art, music, and government all take place in Uptown Shelby historic district. Uptown Shelby is home to a large square, local businesses, and a variety of restaurants surrounding The Courthouse Square. Re-branded as “uptown” in the 70s in order to bring town-people back off the highway and away from the mall, this area has been named a "Main Street" by the National Trust for Historic Preservation.

The local pavilion hosts a twice-a-week Farmers Market on Wednesdays and Saturdays, as well local concerts. Monthly summer festivals like Shelby Alive and Seventh Inning Stretch, hosted by the American Legion World Series, brings regional music acts to perform in the city. With a low cost of living and a vibrant small town environment, Uptown Shelby has experienced a 10% growth in street level  occupancy from 78% to 88%. Uptown Shelby hosts opportunities for active living with groups that engage in cycling, running, crossfit, and yoga. Newgrass brewing, multiple restaurants, and other local businesses are attracting day trippers and shoppers from across the region. Party of the city brand, live music is a part of community with the Earl Scruggs Center and the Don Gibson Theatre.

Other public attractions include walking trails like the thread trail and the Broad River Trail as well as public events. Reoccurring events include the Fall Livermush festival, The Cleveland County fair which is the largest county agricultural fair in North Carolina, The  7thinning Stretch, The Art of Sound, Arts on the Square, and various fundraisers.

Shelby is known throughout the state for its collaborative methods between private, non-profit, and public sector organizations with groups like Leadership Cleveland County.

In 2011, Shelby was named the permanent home of the American Legion Baseball World Series after decades of rotating venues for the event.

Geography
Shelby is located in south-central Cleveland County. U.S. Route 74, a four-lane highway, runs through the city south of the center, and leads east  to Gastonia and west  to Rutherfordton.

Demographics

2020 census

As of the 2020 United States census, there were 21,918 people, 8,013 households, and 4,887 families residing in the city.

2000 census
As of the 2000 United States census, there were 19,477 people, 7,927 households, and 5,144 families residing in the city. The population density was 1,073.8 people per square mile (414.6/km). There were 8,853 housing units at an average density of 488.1/sq mi (188.4/km). The racial makeup of the city was 56.88% White, 40.97% African American, 0.09% Native American, 0.56% Asian, 0.02% Pacific Islander, 0.72% from other races, and 0.76% from two or more races. Hispanic or Latino of any race were 1.56% of the population.

There were 7,927 households, out of which 27.7% had children under the age of 18 living with them, 41.3% were married couples living together, 20.0% had a female householder with no husband present, and 35.1% were non-families. 31.6% of all households were made up of individuals, and 15.1% had someone living alone who was 65 years of age or older. The average household size was 2.37 and the average family size was 2.97.

In the city, the population was spread out, with 25.0% under the age of 18, 7.6% from 18 to 24, 25.8% from 25 to 44, 21.8% from 45 to 64, and 19.7% who were 65 years of age or older. The median age was 39 years. For every 100 females, there were 83.2 males. For every 100 females age 18 and over, there were 75.8 males.

The median income for a household in the city was $29,345, and the median income for a family was $38,603. Males had a median income of $30,038 versus $21,362 for females. The per capita income for the city was $18,708. About 14.3% of families and 17.8% of the population were below the poverty line, including 26.7% of those under age 18 and 13.7% of those age 65 or over.

Transportation

Highways

Shelby is served by US Highway 74 and its business route. US 74 Business travels through uptown Shelby along Marion St. and Warren St., giving travelers access to Shelby's growing central business district. Currently, a controlled-access highway (signed as US 74) is under construction from Mooresboro to Kings Mountain, which will bypass Shelby to the north. Upon completion of the project, Charlotte and Asheville will be connected by virtually uninterrupted freeway via Interstate 85, US Highway 74, and Interstate 26.

Shelby is also served by four North Carolina State Highways.
 North Carolina Highway 18
 North Carolina Highway 150
 North Carolina Highway 180
 North Carolina Highway 226

Airports
Shelby-Cleveland County Regional Airport serves the city and county. The airport is used mostly for general aviation and is owned by the city of Shelby. Commercial air service is provided within a 2-hour drive at Charlotte (CLT), Asheville (AVL), Concord (USA) and Greenville/Spartanburg (GSP).

In popular culture
The film adaptation of Blood Done Sign My Name was filmed in Shelby, as well as the reaping scene in the film adaptation of The Hunger Games.

A fictionalized version of the city is the setting of HBO comedy show Eastbound & Down. Filmed in Wilmington, North Carolina, it bears little geographic or cultural resemblance to the real place. Actor and writer Danny McBride chose the location as an inspiration because of its size, attitude, and name.

The TV show Bizarre Foods with Andrew Zimmern visited the 2009 Livermush festival in Shelby.

On November 11, 2007, the Oxygen Network's "Captured" aired a profile of The Brenda Sue Brown Murder mystery that took place in Shelby in 1966.

Notable people

 Jo Adell, outfielder for the Los Angeles Angels
 Bobby Bell, linebacker for the Kansas City Chiefs, member of the Pro Football Hall of Fame
 Alicia Bridges, disco singer
 Jonathan Bullard, NFL defensive end
 Bill Champion, MLB player
 Morris Davis, colonel in U.S. Air Force
 Asha Degree, child reported missing in 2000
 Thomas Dixon Jr., minister, author
 Eddie Dodson, bank robber
 Robert Lee Durham, educator and lawyer
 Manny Fernandez, "The Raging Bull", professional wrestler
 David Flair, professional wrestler
 Charlotte Flair, professional wrestler
 Margaret Gardner Hoey, First Lady of North Carolina
 Oliver Max Gardner, 57th governor of North Carolina
 Alvin Gentry, head coach of the Sacramento Kings of the NBA
 Don Gibson, singer and songwriter; member of the Country Music Hall of Fame
 Charlie Harbison, University of Missouri defensive backs coach
 Kay Hagan, former U.S. senator for North Carolina
 Tre Harbison, NFL running back
 Robert Harrill, the Fort Fisher Hermit
 Keith E. Haynes, Maryland politician, lawyer
 Norris Hopper, MLB player
 Hatcher Hughes, Pulitzer Prize-winning playwright
 Charlie Justice, NFL player, two-time Heisman Trophy runner-up
 Doug Limerick, ABC radio newscaster
 Patty Loveless, country music singer
 Manteo Mitchell, 2012 Olympics silver medalist in track and field
 Scottie Montgomery, NFL wide receiver, Oakland Raiders, Arena Football League player, head coach at East Carolina University
 Kevin Nanney, former professional Super Smash Brothers Melee player
 Dawson Odums, Southern University football head coach
 Travis Padgett, 2008 Olympics athlete in track and field
 Floyd Patterson, heavyweight boxing champion, Boxing Hall of Famer
 Mel Phillips, former NFL safety, former NFL coach
 Stephanie Pogue, artist and art educator
 Nina Repeta, actress known for her role on Dawson's Creek
 Price D. Rice, U.S. Army Air Corps/U.S. Air Force colonel and member of the Tuskegee Airmen
 Earl Scruggs, banjo player and composer on Hollywood Walk of Fame
 Isaac Shelby, soldier and Governor of Kentucky, for whom the city of Shelby is named
 Charlotte Smith, WNBA basketball player
 Brandon Spikes, linebacker for the New England Patriots
 Billy Standridge, NASCAR driver
 David Thompson, ABA and NBA guard, Basketball Hall of Famer
 Cliff Washburn, NFL offensive tackle, Houston Texans
 Jim Washburn, NFL defensive line coach
 Edwin Y. Webb, politician and judge
 James L. Webb, politician and judge
 Fay Webb-Gardner, First Lady of North Carolina
 Tim Wilkison, former professional tennis player
 Robert Williams, former NFL cornerback
 Tom Wright, MLB player

References

External links
 	
 Shelby, North Carolina, National Park Service Discover Our Shared Heritage travel itinerary
 

Cities in Cleveland County, North Carolina
County seats in North Carolina
Cities in North Carolina